The 2021 Philadelphia Fusion season will be the fourth season of the Philadelphia Fusion's existence in the Overwatch League and their first under head coach Kim "NineK" Bum-hoon.

Preceding offseason

Roster changes 

The Fusion entered free agency with seven free agents, four of which became free agents due to the team not exercising the option to retain the player for another year.

Acquisitions 
The Fusion's first offseason acquisition was Kim "Mano" Dong-gyu, a veteran tank player coming from the New York Excelsior who signed on November 2, 2020. The Fusion next signed Niclas "Shockwave" Jensen, a second-year damage playing who played for the Vancouver Titans in mid-2020, on November 23. Philadelphia did not pick up another player until 2021; on March 15, they signed Kim "Rascal" Dong-jun, a veteran damage player coming off back-to-back Grand Finals championships with the San Francisco Shock. The Fusion next signed Choi "Hotba" Hong-jun, a tank player from the Excelsior who was a part of the Fusion's 2018 Grand Finals team, on April 7. One day later, they signed Yang "Tobi" Jin-mo, a veteran support player coming off a Grand Finals appearance with the Seoul Dynasty in 2020.

Departures 
Five of the Fusion's seven free agents did not return, four of which signed with other teams, beginning with tank players Kim "Fury" Jun-ho and Kim "Sado" Su-min, who signed with the Washington Justice and Toronto Defiant, respectively, on November 21, 2020. The Fusion lost damage player Lee "Ivy" Seung-hyun on December 22 after he signed with the New York Excelsior. Support player Isaac "Boombox" Charles signed with Overwatch Contenders team Young and Beautiful on March 10, 2021. The Fusion's final free agent, damage player Philip "Chipsa" Graham did not sign with a team in the offseason. Outside of free agency, the Fusion transferred damage player Jeong "Heesu" Hee-su to the Toronto Defiant on November 23, 2020.

Regular season

May Melee 
The Fusion began their 2021 season on April 17, with a 3–1 win over the Seoul Dynasty in the May Melee qualifiers. In their following match, they swept the Los Angeles Valiant 3–0.

Final roster

Standings

Game log

Regular season 

|2021 season schedule

Postseason

References 

Philadelphia Fusion
Philadelphia Fusion
Philadelphia Fusion seasons